The Samoan fantail (Rhipidura nebulosa) is a species of bird in the family Rhipiduridae.
It is endemic to Samoa and is found in Upolu and Savaiʻi islands.

Description 
The plumage is mostly dark greyish-brown with white undertail, black tail and light (white or pale smoky) throat. White spot behind the eyes. Like other fantails, Samoan fantail often spreads its long tail like a fan. The usual sounds are a low chirp. Sometimes imitates the voices of other bird species.

Distribution and habitat 
The Samoan fantail is described as common and widespread on Upolu Island and has a limited distribution on the island of Savaiʻi. 

It's natural habitats are subtropical or tropical moist lowland forests and subtropical or tropical moist montane forests. Prefers primary and secondary rainforests, but tolerates man-made landscapes: plantations and gardens.

Taxonomy 

According to IOC there are 2 recognised subspecies. In alphabetical order, these are:
 R. n. altera Mayr, 1931
 R. n. nebulosa Peale, 1849

Samoan fantail (R. nebulosa) forms a superspecies with: 
 Brown fantail (R. drownei)
 Makira fantail (R. tenebrosa)
 Rennell fantail (R. rennelliana)
 Streaked fantail (R. verreauxi)
 Kadavu fantail (R. personata)

References

Birds of Samoa
Rhipidura
Endemic fauna of Samoa
Birds described in 1848
Taxonomy articles created by Polbot
Taxa named by Titian Peale